Let It Be is an album by the saxophonist Bud Shank recorded in 1970 for the Pacific Jazz label.

Reception

AllMusic rated the album with 3 stars.

Track listing
 "Let It Be" (John Lennon, Paul McCartney) - 3:55
 "Games People Play" (Joe South) - 4:43
 "Something" (George Harrison) - 2:59	
 "Long Time Gone" (Tex Ritter, Frank Harford) - 3:37	
 "Both Sides Now"  (Joni Mitchell) - 3:00
 "Love's Been Good to Me" (Jimmy Peppers) - 3:54 
 "A Famous Myth" (Jeffrey Comanor) - 4:04
 "Didn't We?" (Jimmy Webb) - 2:40
 "The Long and Winding Road" (Lennon, McCartney) - 2:45
 "For Once in My Life" (Ron Miller, Orlando Murden) - 3:10

Personnel 
Bud Shank - alto saxophone
Roger Kellaway - piano
Dennis Budimir - guitar
Carol Kaye - electric bass
John Guerin - drums
The Bob Alcivar Singers arranged and conducted by Bob Alcivar

References 

1970 albums
Pacific Jazz Records albums
Bud Shank albums